Radhouane Slimane (born 16 August 1980) is a Tunisian basketball player who plays for US Monastir of the Championnat National A. Standing at , Slimane mainly plays as power forward.

Born in Kairouan, he started out his career playing six seasons with his hometown team JS Kairouan. Slimane then played in Portugal, the United Arab Emirates as well as other Arab countries. He spent significant time with ES Sahel before signing with US Monastir. He captained Monastir to their first BAL championship in 2022.

Slimane played for the Tunisia national basketball team during his career, winning three AfroBasket tournaments in 2011, 2017 and 2021.

Career
Slimane has played for several teams in his ten-year basketball career, including stops in Portugal, Saudi Arabia, the United Arab Emirates, and his native Tunisia.  He is known for his rough, physical style of play.

Slimane is a member of the Tunisia national basketball team and made his most recent appearance at the 2010 FIBA World Championship.  Prior to that, he competed at the 2007 FIBA Africa Championship before having a fallout with the Tunisian Federation.  Shortly before the 2010 World Championship, he made amends with the Federation and joined the team in Turkey.

In September 2020, Slimane signed a 2-year contract with US Monastir for a second stint with the team.

Awards and accomplishments

Club
JS Kairouan
3× Championnat National A: (2001, 2002, 2003)
2× Tunisian Cup: (2002, 2005)
Maghreb Championship: (2003)
ES Sahel
Championnat National A: (2011)
2× Arab Club Basketball Championship: (2015, 2016)
2× Tunisian Cup: (2011, 2016)
US Monastir
Basketball Africa League: (2022)
4× Championnat National A: (2019, 2020, 2021, 2022)
3× Tunisian Cup: (2020, 2021, 2022)

National team
Tunisia
AfroBasket:  Gold medal in 2011, 2017, 2021

Individual
All-BAL First Team: (2022)
Tunisian Cup Final MVP: (2022)
Championnat National A Best Forward of the Season: (2019)

BAL career statistics

|-
|style="text-align:left;"|2021
|style="text-align:left;"|Monastir
| 6 || 6 || 22.4 || .488 || .481 || .818 || 4.0 || 2.7 || .5 || .0 || 10.3
|- class="sortbottom"
|style="text-align:left;" style="text-align:left;background:#afe6ba;"|2022†
|style="text-align:left;"|Monastir
| 8 || 8 || 31.0 || .424|| .294 || .903 || 5.0 || 3.9 || 1.1 || .6 || 14.4

References

External links

Tunisian men's basketball players
1980 births
Living people
Basketball players at the 2012 Summer Olympics
AS Salé (basketball) players
Olympic basketball players of Tunisia
Forwards (basketball)
Tunisian expatriate basketball people in Portugal
Tunisian expatriate basketball people in Saudi Arabia
Tunisian expatriate basketball people in the United Arab Emirates
Étoile Sportive du Sahel basketball players
People from Kairouan
2010 FIBA World Championship players
Mediterranean Games bronze medalists for Tunisia
Mediterranean Games medalists in basketball
Competitors at the 2013 Mediterranean Games
2019 FIBA Basketball World Cup players
Sharjah SC basketball players
US Monastir basketball players
21st-century Tunisian people